The Green Alliance is a green political party in Colombia. The party advocates social justice, electoral reform and economic sustainability.

The party supports the Colombian peace process and formed the electoral alliance Coalition Colombia with centrist and centre-left parties such as Civic Compromise to present a single presidential candidate, Sergio Fajardo in the 2018 presidential election.

History
The party was founded on November 25, 2005 in Bogotá by a group of people headed by Carlos Ramón González Merchan and Elías Pineda.

2007 regional elections

For the October 28, 2007 Colombian regional elections to elect department governors, department assembly deputies, mayors and councils and Local Administrative Juntas the party surprisingly won the governorships of Cesar with candidate Cristian Moreno Panezo and Boyacá with candidate José Roso Millán. The party also obtained 23 municipal mayors.

2010 congressional elections
Three independent former mayors of Bogota, Luis Eduardo Garzón, Antanas Mockus, and Enrique Peñalosa, formed an alliance to choose an independent candidate for the presidency. However, they required a political structure. The ad-hoc coalition merged with the Centre Option Green Party, which changed its name to Green Party. Following this, the new party joined by many regional politicians.

Mockus was elected candidate for the presidency in the Green Party's primary elections, held on March 14, 2010. On the same day, the party gained 5 seats in the Senate. Independent presidential candidate and former mayor of Medellín, Sergio Fajardo, joined the Mockus campaign soon after and was chosen as the Green Party's Vice Presidential candidate.

2010 Presidential Elections

On May 30, 2010, the party's candidate Antanas Mockus came second in the first round of the 2010 presidential election with 21% of the vote. In the second round, he was defeated by Juan Manuel Santos, who won 68% of the vote to Mockus' 28%.

Slogans
"Your Life is Sacred"
"Public Resources are Sacred"
"Not Everything is Justifiable"
"Conscience Vote"
"Natural Resources Are Sacred"

See also
Oxygen Green Party

References

External links
 Colombian Green Alliance

Colombian Green Party
Green Alliance
Political parties established in 2005
Global Greens member parties
2005 establishments in Colombia